Darzab (also Romanized as Darzāb and Darz Āb) is a village in Bajestan Rural District, in the Central District of Bajestan County, Razavi Khorasan Province, Iran. At the 2006 census, its population was 347, in 102 families.

Darzab Yellow Castle 
Darzab Yellow Castle belongs to the Safavid period and is located in the village of Darzab in the city of Bajestan. This work was registered as one of the national monuments of Iran on December 1, 2001 with the registration number 4578.

References 

Populated places in Bajestan County